Kathleen Walsh may refer to:
Kathleen E. Walsh, president and CEO of Boston Medical Center
Kay Walsh (1911–2005), actress and dancer
Kate Walsh (actress) (born 1967), American actress and businesswoman
Kathleen Walsh, character in Medium played by Molly Ringwald
Kathleen Walsh (camogie) in All-Ireland Senior Camogie Championship 1932

See also
Kathy Walsh (disambiguation)
Kate Walsh (disambiguation)
Catherine Walsh (disambiguation)